Timothy Riddiough is an American researcher and academic. He is the James A. Graaskamp Chair and the Chair of the department of real estate and urban land economics at University of Wisconsin–Madison. He is best known for his work on credit risk in mortgage lending, mortgage securitization, real options, REIT investment and corporate finance, and land use regulation.

Riddiough is the past recipient of the American Real Estate and Urban Economics Association best dissertation and best paper awards, and is a fellow at the Homer Hoyt Institute for Advanced Studies as well as the Real Estate Research Institute. He was President of the American Real Estate and Urban Economics Association in 2012. He has served on the boards of several organizations and has consulted on numerous issues, including sub-prime mortgage lending, securitization, capital structure, and firm valuation.

Education and early career 
Riddiough graduated from Madison East High School in Madison, Wisconsin in 1976. Riddiough received a B.B.A. in statistics and operations research in 1981 and an M.S. in finance, investment and banking in 1984, both from University of Wisconsin-Madison. From 1984 to 1988, he worked in the mortgage insurance business and later joined University of Wisconsin-Madison for a Ph.D. in real estate and urban land economics. At the same time, he started teaching as a lecturer at the university.

During his Ph.D. studies, Riddiough worked as James Graaskamp's research assistant. In his Ph.D. dissertation published in 1991, Riddiough coined the term 'trigger event', which is used to indicate mortgage default outcomes that are the result of a low house price combined with an income interruption event such as job loss or severe illness. His dissertation received the AREUEA Best Dissertation Award in 1992.

Career 
In 1991, after completing his Ph.D., Riddiough joined the University of Cincinnati as an assistant professor. He left University of Cincinnati in 1994 to join the Massachusetts Institute of Technology as an assistant professor, becoming an associate professor in 1997 and gaining tenure in 2000. He was the Edward H. Linde Career Development Chair from 1994 to 2001. At MIT, he developed and taught the first real estate capital markets course. He also participated in several of the early PREA Institute events held at MIT in the 1990s, teaching principles of commercial property development, investment, and real estate capital market intermediation.

In 2001, Riddiough moved to University of Wisconsin-Madison, where he was endowed with the E.J. Plesko Chair. He was initially appointed director of the real estate center in 2003, holding that position until 2009. He was again appointed the director of James Graaskamp Center in 2014 and then again in 2019. From 2010 to 2018, he served as the director of the Applied Real Estate Investment Program. He was appointed as the James A. Graaskamp Chair in 2015. In 2018, Riddiough was appointed as the Chair of the Department of Real Estate and Urban Land Economics.

In 2000, Riddiough was selected as co-editor of the applied research journal, Real Estate Finance, a position he held until 2008. In 2009, he was appointed to the Advisory Council of NAREIT Real Estate Investment and in 2011 as a senior advisor at the Bank for International Settlements.

Research and work 
In 1994, Riddiough coined the term 'strategic default', which is used to indicate purposeful borrower default in order to extract concessions from a lender. The phrase, along with the term 'trigger event,' have been commonly used in the literature and popular media since the financial crisis of 2008. His original work on these issues was the result of working on problems associated with the savings and loan crisis that occurred in the 1980s.

During the middle to late 1990s, Riddiough published research papers highlighting various aspects of commercial property development and investment, focusing on issues like option value to real estate development, how government regulation limits investor flexibility, and how imperfect asset valuation impacts competitive investment outcomes in urban areas. During this period, Riddiough also wrote the first academic research papers on the pricing of commercial mortgage-backed securities, the optimal tranche sizing of asset-backed securities, and conflicts of interest that exist between junior and senior security tranches in the resolution of defaulted loans.

After moving to Madison in 2001, Riddiough wrote one of the first papers comparing the public versus private market investment performance in commercial real estate, and began a long-running research program on the strategic use of leverage to finance public as well as private property firms.

In 2005, Riddiough wrote one of the first articles warning of the dangers of excess leverage in property markets, and after the Subprime mortgage crisis he frequently spoke on the causes and consequences of the crisis. During this time he consulted with central banks in Europe and Asia, and acted as a senior advisor to the Bank for International Settlements on issues of property markets and financial stability. One outcome of his work at the BIS was an applied empirical paper published in the Journal of Portfolio Management linking growth in the capitalization of equity REITs in the US to a reduction in construction-based boom and bust in commercial property markets.

In the late 2010s, Riddiough's work was focused on liquidity issues associated with pension fund investment in major commercial property markets.

Awards and honors 
1991 – Best Dissertation Award, American Real Estate and Urban Economics Association
2002 - Elected Fellow of Homer Hoyt Institute of Advanced Studies
2003 - Recipient of Edwin S. Mills/American Real Estate and Urban Economics Association Best Research Paper of the Year Award, Inaugural Award
2004 – Founding Fellow of the Real Estate Research Institute
2012 - Best Paper Award, AREUEA International Conference, Singapore

Selected articles 
Riddiough, T., & Wyatt, S. (1994). Strategic default, workout, and commercial mortgage valuation. The Journal Of Real Estate Finance And Economics, 9(1), 5-22.
Childs, P., Ott, S., & Riddiough, T. (1996). The Pricing of Multiclass Commercial Mortgage-Backed Securities. The Journal Of Financial And Quantitative Analysis, 31(4), 581.
Riddiough, T. (1997). The Economic Consequences of Regulatory Taking Risk on Land Value and Development Activity. Journal Of Urban Economics, 41(1), 56-77.
Riddiough, T. (1997). Optimal Design and Governance of Asset-Backed Securities. Journal Of Financial Intermediation, 6(2), 121-152.
Childs, P., Ott, S., & Riddiough, T. (2002). Optimal Valuation of Noisy Real Assets. Real Estate Economics, 30(3), 385-414.
Riddiough, T., Moriarty, M., & Yeatman, P. (2005). Privately Versus Publicly Held Asset Investment Performance. Real Estate Economics, 33(1), 121-146.
Brown, D., Ciochetti, B., & Riddiough, T. (2006). Theory and Evidence on the Resolution of Financial Distress. Review Of Financial Studies, 19(4), 1357-1397.
Gan, J., & Riddiough, T. (2007). Monopoly and Information Advantage in the Residential Mortgage Market. Review Of Financial Studies, 21(6), 2677-2703.
Packer, F., Riddiough, T., & Shek, J. (2013). Securitization and the Supply Cycle: Evidence from the REIT Market. The Journal Of Portfolio Management, 39(5), 134-143.
Riddiough, T., & Thompson, H. (2018). When prosperity merges into crisis: the decline and fall of Ohio Life and the Panic of 1857. American Nineteenth Century History, 19(3), 289-313.
Riddiough, T., & Steiner, E. (2018). Financial Flexibility and Manager-Shareholder Conflict: Evidence from REITs. Real Estate Economics.

References 

Living people
Year of birth missing (living people)
University of Wisconsin–Madison faculty
University of Wisconsin–Madison alumni
Massachusetts Institute of Technology faculty
Madison East High School alumni